Vera Spanke (born 13 December 1996) is a German rower.

She won a medal at the 2019 World Rowing Championships.

References

External links

1996 births
Living people
German female rowers
World Rowing Championships medalists for Germany